Poland competed at the 1952 Winter Olympics in Oslo, Norway.

Alpine skiing

Men

Women

Cross-country skiing

Men

Ice hockey

The tournament was run in a round-robin format with nine teams participating.

Czechoslovakia 8-2 Poland
Sweden 17-1 Poland
Switzerland 6-3 Poland
Canada 11-0 Poland
Poland 4-4 Germany FR
USA 5-3 Poland
Poland 4-2 Finland
Norway 3-4 Poland

Contestants
Michał Antuszewicz
Henryk Bromowicz
Kazimierz Chodakowski
Stefan Csorich
Rudolf Czech
Alfred Gansiniec
Jan Hampel
Marian Jeżak
Eugeniusz Lewacki
Roman Penczek
Hilary Skarżyński
Tadeusz Świcarz
Stanisław Szlendak
Zdzisław Trojanowski
Antoni Wróbel
Alfred Wróbel

Ski jumping

References

 Olympic Winter Games 1952, full results by sports-reference.com

Nations at the 1952 Winter Olympics
1952
Olympics